John Hieftje is an American politician who served as the 60th mayor of Ann Arbor, Michigan. Hieftje began his political career in 1999, when he was elected to the city council for Ann Arbor's 1st Ward as a Democrat. He was first as Mayor in 2000, and was re-elected in 2002, 2004, 2006, 2008, 2010 and 2012.

Early life
Hieftje was born in Battle Creek, Michigan and grew up in Ann Arbor. Hieftje worked for the United States Forest Service and as a real estate agent. He graduated from Eastern Michigan University in Ypsilanti, Michigan in 1997.

Environmentalist stance
Hieftje has campaigned as an environmentalist, advocating for various alternative energy, anti-sprawl, and parks measures. The largest of these was a 2003 ballot initiative in which Ann Arbor residents were asked to approve property tax increases to fund the Ann Arbor Parks and Greenbelt Program. This anti-sprawl program called for the purchase of conservation easements on up to 7,000 acres (28 km²) of land in and around the city in order to preserve farmland and open space. On November 4, 2003, Ann Arbor residents approved this program 2-1, generating about $35 million to purchase land.

Hieftje considers himself "an environmentalist and a fiscal conservative."

Career and awards
Hieftje has served on the boards of the Ann Arbor Summer Festival, the Michigan Theater, the Huron River Watershed Council, and the Lake Superior Conservancy and Watershed Council. He has served as Co-Chair of the Washtenaw Metro Alliance and as Chair of Recycle Ann Arbor and of Urban Core Mayors of Michigan. He is a member of the Sierra Club, the Ecology Center of Ann Arbor, and the National Wildlife Federation (Great Lakes Office).

Hieftje has won several awards, including Local Elected Official of the Year Award from the Michigan Recreation and Parks Association, the Conservation Leadership Award from the Greater Detroit Audubon Society, the Conservation Award from the Huron Valley Group of Sierra Club, and the Preservationist of the Year Award from Washtenaw Land Trust.

Electoral history

City Council

1999

Mayor

2000

2002

2004

2006

2008

2010

2012

References

External links

Mayor of Ann Arbor

Mayors of Ann Arbor, Michigan
Living people
Eastern Michigan University alumni
Michigan Democrats
Year of birth missing (living people)
21st-century American politicians